The Mira-Bhayandar Municipal Corporation is the governing body of the city of Mira-Bhayandar in the Indian state of Maharashtra. It consists of democratically elected members, headed by a mayor who administers the city's infrastructure, public services and police. Members of the state's leading political parties hold elected offices in the corporation.

History 
The municipal corporation is in Bhayandar. Municipal Corporation mechanism in India was introduced during British Rule with formation of municipal corporation in Madras (Chennai) in 1688, later followed by municipal corporations in Bombay (Mumbai) and Calcutta (Kolkata) by 1762. Mira-Bhayandar Municipal Corporation is headed by Mayor of city and governed by Commissioner. Mira-Bhayandar Municipal Corporation has been formed with functions to improve the infrastructure of town.

Revenue sources 

The following are the Income sources for the Corporation from the Central and State Government.

Revenue from taxes  
Following is the Tax related revenue for the corporation.

 Property tax.
 Profession tax.
 Entertainment tax.
 Grants from Central and State Government like Goods and Services Tax.
 Advertisement tax.

Revenue from non-tax sources 

Following is the Non Tax related revenue for the corporation.

 Water usage charges.
 Fees from Documentation services.
 Rent received from municipal property.
 Funds from municipal bonds.

Election results

2017 results

2012 results

List of Mayor

List of Deputy Mayor
Steven John Mendonca - 2007-2012

References 

Municipal corporations in Maharashtra
Mira-Bhayandar
Year of establishment missing